Ajuran currency was an old coinage system minted in the Ajuran Sultanate. The polity was a Somali Muslim kingdom that ruled over large parts of the Horn of Africa during the Middle Ages. The Ajuran Sultanate maintained an active commercial network with other contemporaneous polities in the Arabian peninsula, Near East and Central Asia. Many ancient bronze coins inscribed with the names of Ajuran Sultans have been found in the coastal Benadir province in southern Somalia, in addition to pieces from the Sultanate's Islamic trading partners in Southern Arabia and Persia.

See also
Mogadishu currency
Somali aristocratic and court titles

References

Numismatics
Economic history of Somalia
Ajuran Sultanate
Currencies of Somalia